Arden is a small unincorporated community located along the Tygart Valley River in Barbour County in the north central portion of the U.S. state of West Virginia.

The Arden settlement was built up along a stretch of the Baltimore and Ohio Railroad tracks; a narrow-gauge railroad was first laid through this area in the early 1880s. It had its own post office at one time.

The community is known today to whitewater enthusiasts as being situated between two landmark rock formations: Hell's Gate and Devil's Den.

Notable person
Ida Lilliard Reed (1865-1951), noted hymnwriter, lived nearby.

References

Unincorporated communities in Barbour County, West Virginia
Unincorporated communities in West Virginia